Vasilinda is a surname. Notable people with the surname include:

Mike Vasilinda, American news reporter
Michelle Rehwinkel Vasilinda (born 1960), American lawyer and politician, wife of Mike